This is a list of the Australia national soccer team's results from 1922 to the present day that, for various reasons, are not accorded the status of official International A Matches.

1920s

1922

1923

1924

1925

1927

1928

1930s

1931

1933

1935

1936

1937

1939

1940s

1941

1947

1948

1949

1950s

1950

1951

1952

1953

1954

1955

1956

1957

1958

1959

1960s

1964

1965

1966

1967

1969

1970s

1970

1971

1972

1973

1974

1975

1976

1977

1979

1980s

1980

1981

1983

1984

1990s

1990

1999

2000s

2006

2008

2010s

2014

Australia national soccer team results
Lists of national association football team unofficial results